Yemen's constitution is based on a combination of sharia, old Egyptian laws, and Napoleonic tradition. Defendants are presumed innocent until proven guilty; indigent defendants in felony cases are by law entitled to counsel, but in practice this does not always occur. Trials, which are generally public, are conducted without juries; judges adjudicate criminal cases. All defendants have the right of appeal. Women often suffer discrimination, particularly in domestic matters.

Although Yemen's constitution provides for an autonomous judiciary and independent judges, in reality the judiciary is managed by an executive-branch council, the Supreme Judicial Council (SJC), and judges are appointed and can be removed by the executive branch. The judicial system itself is considered weak; corruption is widespread; the government is often reluctant to enforce judgments; and judges are subject to harassment from tribal leaders, who themselves exercise significant discretion in the interpretation and application of the law. There have been several restructurings of the judiciary since the government initiated a judicial reform program in 1997, but none have resulted in any significant improvements in the functioning of the system or produced evidence of having reduced corruption.

References